Hypermnestra is a daughter of Danaus and ancestor of the Danaids in Greek mythology.

Hypermnestra may also refer to:
 Hypermnestra (daughter of Thestius), daughter of Thestius and Eurythemis
 Mestra, daughter of Erysichthon

See also
 Hypermnestra helios, a swallowtail butterfly